Elk County is a county in the Commonwealth of Pennsylvania. As of the 2020 United States census, the population was 30,990. Its county seat is Ridgway. The county was created on April 18, 1843, from parts of Jefferson, Clearfield, and McKean Counties. Elk County is named for the eastern elk (Cervus canadensis) that historically inhabited the region.  

The county is notable for having one of the highest concentrations of Roman Catholics in the United States, with 69% of the county's residents identifying as Catholic.

Geography
Elk County consists of low rolling hills, carved by frequent drainages and heavily wooded. 

Elk has a warm-summer humid continental climate (Dfb) and average monthly temperatures in Ridgway range from 23.2 °F in January to 67.4 °F in July, while in Saint Marys they range from 22.6 °F in January to 66.8 °F in July.

Adjacent counties
 McKean County - north
 Cameron County - east
 Clearfield County - south
 Jefferson County - southwest
 Forest County - west
 Warren County - northwest

National protected area
 Allegheny National Forest (part)

State protected areas
 Bendigo State Park
 Elk State Park

Major highways

Demographics 

As of the 2020 United States Census, there were 30,990 people and 14,215 households. The population density was 38/sqmi (16/km2). There were 16,855 housing units at an average density of 20/sqmi (8/km2). The racial makeup of the county was 97.9% White, 0.5% Black or African American, 0.2% Native American, 0.4% Asian, and 1.0% from two or more races. 0.8% of the population were Hispanic or Latino of any race. 41% were of German, 13% Italian, 9% American, 6% Irish, 4% Polish, 4% Swedish, 3% English.

There were 14,124 households, out of which 31.00% had children under the age of 18 living with them, 56.00% were married couples living together, 8.70% had a female householder with no husband present, and 31.00% were non-families. 27.30% of all households were made up of individuals, and 13.60% had someone living alone who was 65 years of age or older.  The average household size was 2.45 and the average family size was 2.99.

The county population contained 24.00% under the age of 18, 6.80% from 18 to 24, 28.60% from 25 to 44, 23.30% from 45 to 64, and 17.30% who were 65 years of age or older. The median age was 39 years. For every 100 females there were 98.00 males. For every 100 females aged 18 and over, there were 95.30 males.

Elk County has one of the highest concentrations of Roman Catholics in the United States. As of 2010, nearly 70% of the county's residents identified as Catholic.

2020 Census

Economy 
As of the 2021 ACS 5-Year Estimates, Elk County's largest industry and source of employment is manufacturing, with the second largest being educational services, healthcare, and social services.

Government and politics 

|}

Voter demographics 
As of November 4, 2022, there are 20,227 registered voters in Elk County.

 Democratic: 6,768 (33.46%)
 Republican: 11,123 (54.99%)
 Third Party: 2,336 (11.55%)

Elk County was primarily settled by German Catholics and the county's politics have historically been defined by the county's Catholic heritage. Prior to 1896, the county was a Democratic stronghold, similar to most other German Catholic counties with populations opposed to the Civil War, and while Republicans won the county from 1896 to 1908, their margins were far narrower than their margins nationwide. In the 1910s, the county's predominantly German-American populace became opposed to the foreign policies of the Wilson Administration, and thus voted against Wilson in 1916, as well as giving Republicans Warren G. Harding and Calvin Coolidge over 65% of the vote. In 1928, however, with Catholic Al Smith as the Democratic nominee, he won nearly 60% of the county's vote and received a higher percentage of the vote than FDR did in any of his four presidential runs, even though FDR won his four elections with landslide margins and Smith lost by a landslide.

Elk County tended to be politically competitive in statewide and national elections. The county has frequently voted with the eventual winner of national elections, from 1920 to 2008, except for 1928 when Al Smith carried the county with nearly 60% of the vote over winner Herbert Hoover (due to the county's Catholicism), 1940 when Wendell Willkie carried the county with a very slim margin of 29 votes over incumbent Franklin D. Roosevelt (due to tensions between the Roosevelt administration and Germany), and in 1968, when Hubert Humphrey won it over eventual winner Richard Nixon. The county was carried by George W. Bush in 2000 and 2004, and by Barack Obama in 2008 

The county has recently become a solid Republican county like most of rural Pennsylvania. Mitt Romney won the county in 2012 over Obama's victorious ticket. Like most other rural counties, both in Pennsylvania and nationwide, Donald Trump strongly won the county in 2016 and 2020 — increasing his margin in the latter, making it the strongest performance by any single candidate in the county's history (although Coolidge had carried the county by a larger margin in 1924).

County commissioners
 Joseph Daghir, Republican
 M. Fritz Lecker, Republican
 Matthew G. Quesenberry, Democrat

Other county offices
 Clerk of Courts and Prothonotary, Susanne Schneider, Republican
 Coroner, Michelle Muccio, Republican
 District Attorney, Thomas G.G. Coppolo
 Register of Wills and Recorder of Deeds, Lee Neureiter, Republican
 Sheriff, Todd Caltagarone, Republican
 Treasurer, Peggy Schneider, Democrat

State representative
 Mike Armanini, Republican, 75th district

State senator
 Cris Dush, Republican, 25th district

United States representative
 Glenn "G.T." Thompson, Republican, 15th district

United States senators 

 John Fetterman, Democrat
 Bob Casey Jr., Democrat

Education

Community education center 
The Community Education Center of Elk and Cameron Counties (or CEC) provides credit, non-credit, and enrichment programs.

Public school districts
 Brockway Area School District
 Forest Area School District
 Kane Area School District
 Johnsonburg Area School District
 Ridgway Area School District
 Saint Marys Area School District

Private schools

 Elk County Catholic High School
 St Boniface School - Kersey
 St Leo School - Ridgway
 St Marys Catholic Elementary School = Saint Marys
 St Marys Catholic Middle School = Saint Marys
 North Central Workforce Investment Board - Ridgway
 Anne Forbes Nursery School - Ridgway

Libraries

 Elk County Library System - Saint Marys
 Johnsonburg Public Library - Johnsonburg
 Ridgway Free Public Library - Ridgway
 Saint Marys Public Library - Saint Marys
 Tri State Coll Library Co-Op - Rosemont
 Wilcox Public Library - Wilcox

Communities

Under Pennsylvania law, there are four types of incorporated municipalities: cities, boroughs, townships, and, in at most two cases, towns. The following cities, boroughs, and townships are located in Elk County:

City
 St. Marys

Boroughs
 Johnsonburg
 Ridgway (county seat)

Census-designated places
Census-designated places are geographical areas designated by the U.S. Census Bureau for the purposes of compiling demographic data. They are not actual jurisdictions under Pennsylvania law. Other unincorporated communities, such as villages, may be listed here as well.
 Byrnedale
 Force
 James City
 Kersey
 Weedville
 Wilcox

Unincorporated communities 
 Arroyo
 Dagus Mines
 Loleta
 Portland Mills

Townships

 Benezette
 Fox
 Highland
 Horton
 Jay
 Jones
 Millstone
 Ridgway
 Spring Creek

Population ranking
The population ranking of the following table is based on the 2010 census of Elk County.

† county seat

See also
 National Register of Historic Places listings in Elk County, Pennsylvania

References

 
1843 establishments in Pennsylvania
Counties of Appalachia
Populated places established in 1843